MTS was a Eurodance project formed in Canada. The project consisted of Thomas Henry "Tom" Delaney, Daphne and Joanne. The most successful song from MTS is "I'll Be Allright", which peaked at #1 in the RPM Dance chart from Canada.  In the United States, the song peaked at #102 on the Bubbling Under Hot 100 Singles.

In 1997, they released a studio album.

References

Canadian Eurodance groups